Quest was a collectable magazine published in the United Kingdom by Marshall Cavendish from the late 1980s to the early 1990s.

Quest was of their 'Partworks' educational range covering a range of science and technology related topics, such as construction, cities, transport and drugs.  The articles in each part were categorized under six topics: The living world, planet Earth, futures, energy and resources, new technology, and space frontiers.

Quest was available in fortnightly, hole-punched editions which would often come with a collectable element, such as playing cards for a 'trivial pursuit-like game' or cardboard models. There were 60 regular issues – enough to fill three official binders which came with special editions of the magazine (of which there were four).

References

Biweekly magazines published in the United Kingdom
Science and technology magazines published in the United Kingdom
Defunct magazines published in the United Kingdom
Magazines with year of establishment missing
Magazines with year of disestablishment missing